Piel de Barrabás is a 1981 music album by the Spanish group Barrabás. It was the band's seventh album and the first after the band's four-year break. It marked the return of drummer José María Moll, and the arrival of new members Armando Pelayo, Susy Gordaliza and Koky Maning.

A song inspired by the Cold War, "Please Mr Reagan, Please Mr Breznev", was released as a single in some countries, with "Laura" as the B-side. "On the Road Again" was also a single, with "Hard Line for a Dreamer" as the B-side, and this reached #9 in the Swiss charts.

Track listing
"On the Road Again" (Fernando Arbex) – 5:52
"What's Happened" (Arbex, Jorge Eduardo Maning) – 4:04
"Hard Line for a Dreamer" (Arbex, Jesús Moll, José María Moll) – 4:45
"Please Mr Reagan, Please Mr Breznev" (Arbex) – 5:53
"Wild Cat" (Arbex) – 4:49
"Jeronimo" (Arbex) – 5:20
"Be the Way to Be" (Arbex, Jesús Gordaliza) – 3:39
"Laura" (Arbex, Moll, Moll) – 5:02

Personnel
José Luis Tejada – vocals, harmonica
Jorge Eduardo "Koky" Maning – guitar, vocals 
Jesús "Susy" Gordaliza – bass guitar, vocals 
Ernesto "Tito" Duarte - saxophone, flute, percussion
Armando Pelayo – keyboards
José María Moll – drums, vocals
Nani Prosper, Naomi Hussey, Mari Jamison, Paula Nerea – chorus vocals
Fernando Arbex, Jordi Soley – production
Engineer – Luís Calleja
Mixed by Jame Rathbone
Photography – Peter Müller
Design – Juan Aboli
Recorded at Kirios Studios, Madrid

Release information
Spain – Discos Columbia (RCA) TXS-3214
Disconforme DISC 1996CD (2000 CD, re-released 2004)

References

Entry at Allmusic []
Album sleeve notes

1981 albums
Barrabás albums